Ùssita is a comune (municipality) in the Province of Macerata in the Italian region Marche, located about  southwest of Ancona and about  southwest of Macerata.

The communal seat is in the frazione of Fluminata.

Main sights
Castle, now in ruins including a 14th-century tower
 Santa Maria Assunta: 14th century parish church
 Sant'Antonio da Padova 
 Sant'Ercolano: 13th century Chiesetta 
 Santa Lucia di Sasso: 15th-17th centuries
 Santi Vincenzo e Anastasio: 14th century 
 Santa Reparata: 20th century 
 San Stefano: 13th century 
 Sant'Andrea Apostolo: 15th - 17th centuries

References

External links
 www.ussita.sinp.net

Cities and towns in the Marche